Roseane Ferreira dos Santos (born 15 October 1971) is a paralympic athlete from Brazil competing mainly in category F58 throwing events.

Roseane first competed in the 2000 Summer Paralympics winning a gold in both the discus and shot put and finished fifth in the javelin. Despite competing in the shot and discus in 2004 and 2008 these would prove to be her only medals.

References

External links
 

1971 births
Living people
Brazilian female shot putters
Brazilian female discus throwers
Paralympic athletes of Brazil
Paralympic gold medalists for Brazil
Paralympic medalists in athletics (track and field)
Athletes (track and field) at the 2000 Summer Paralympics
Athletes (track and field) at the 2004 Summer Paralympics
Athletes (track and field) at the 2008 Summer Paralympics
Athletes (track and field) at the 2016 Summer Paralympics
Medalists at the 2000 Summer Paralympics
Medalists at the 2007 Parapan American Games
Medalists at the 2011 Parapan American Games
Medalists at the 2015 Parapan American Games
People from Maceió
Sportspeople from Alagoas
21st-century Brazilian women
20th-century Brazilian women
Wheelchair shot putters
Wheelchair discus throwers
Paralympic shot putters
Paralympic discus throwers